Lee Chang-Won (born 10 July 1975) is a South Korean football defender, who plays for Pohang Steelers in the K-League. Lee previously played for Chunnam Dragons.

Honors

Club
Chunnam Dragons
KFA Cup Runner-up : 2003

Pohang Steelers
K-League Winner : 2007
KFA Cup
Winner : 2008
Runner-up : 2007
K-League Cup Winner : 2009
AFC Champions League Winner : 2009

Club career statistics

External links 
 

1975 births
Living people
South Korean footballers
Pohang Steelers players
Jeonnam Dragons players
K League 1 players
Yeungnam University alumni
Association football defenders